Victor Golovatenco (born 28 April 1984) is a former Moldovan footballer.

International career
Golovatenco has made 79 appearances for the senior Moldova national football team, scoring three goals. He ranks second in terms of all-time appearances for Moldova. He has played for Moldova in the UEFA Euro 2008 qualifying, UEFA Euro 2012 qualifying and UEFA Euro 2016 qualifying, as well as the 2010 FIFA World Cup qualification, 2014 FIFA World Cup qualification and 2018 FIFA World Cup qualification.

Career statistics

International
As of 26 March 2021

Scores and results list Moldova's goal tally first.

References

External links

 

1984 births
Living people
Moldovan footballers
Moldovan expatriate footballers
Moldovan expatriate sportspeople in Russia
Moldova international footballers
Expatriate footballers in Russia
Association football defenders
FC Sheriff Tiraspol players
Moldovan Super Liga players
FC Tiraspol players
Footballers from Chișinău
FC Khimki players
FC Kuban Krasnodar players
Russian Premier League players
FC Sibir Novosibirsk players
Russian First League players
CSF Bălți players
FC Zimbru Chișinău players